Christ Episcopal Church is an Anglo-Catholic Episcopal church in Woodbury, New Jersey. Founded in 1854, the parish is part of the Episcopal Diocese of New Jersey and a member of the Anglican Communion.

The parish was established by the first rector, the Reverend William Herbert Norris, at the direction of Bishop George Washington Doane; the church building was finished in 1856 and consecrated September 17, 1857. In 1911, a fire in the undercroft of the church nearly caused the loss of the building; during the fire the women of the church rescued the altar cloth, bible, and bishop's chair. The bishop's chair is still used for visiting bishops today.

The adjoining parish house was renovated in 2018. In addition to serving as the assembly room for coffee hours and parish meetings, in the 1930s and 1940s it also served as the performance space for the Woodbury Sketch Club.

In 2020 the congregation reported 862 members, average Sunday attendance of 208, and plate and pledge financial support of $261,924.

The church's pipe organ is M. P. Moller Opus 10523 (1969c) with eight ranks and two manuals. The previous installation was Hook & Hastings Opus 1747 (1897) with two manuals and 17 registers. The building includes stained glass by installed over two centuries from English and American workshops, with notable work by Paula Himmelsbach Balano (1877-1967), a German-American church artist working in a medium uncommon for women at the time of her installations. The sanctuary is designed to accommodate ad orientem liturgical celebration.

Clergy

 The Rev. William Herbert Norris
 The Rev. William E. Lewis
 The Rev. George M. Bond
 The Rev. Howard E. Thompson
 The Rev. Abram L. Urban
 The Rev. Malcolm Taylor
 The Rev. James O. McIlhenny
 The Rev. Edgar Campbell
 The Rev. Howard M. Stuckert
 The Rev. Robert G. W. Williams
 The Rev. The Rev. William V. Rauscher, Jr.
 The Rev. Douglas E. Anderson
 The Rev. Brian K. Burgess, now Bishop of the Episcopal Diocese of Springfield, Illinois
 The Rev. John D. Alexander SSC (interim)

References

External links
 
Highlights in the History of Christ Church, Woodbury, New Jersey (1971) from Project Canterbury

19th-century Episcopal church buildings
Episcopal church buildings in New Jersey
Churches in Gloucester County, New Jersey
Anglo-Catholic church buildings in the United States
Woodbury, New Jersey